The Arkansas Department of Health (ADH or commonly Health Department within the state) is a department of the government of Arkansas under the Governor of Arkansas. It is responsible for protecting health and well-being for all Arkansans. ADH is a unified health department, with a central office coordinating among 94 local health units.

The ADH is a cabinet level agency in the executive branch of government responsible for implementation of the rules and regulations promulgated by the Arkansas State Board of Health. The Board of Health nominates the Director of ADH. Each county has a County Health Officer, appointed by the county judge and approved by the Board.

Boards and Commissions
In Arkansas's shared services model of state government, the cabinet-level agencies assist boards and commissions who have an overlapping scope. ADH supports:

Boards
Acupuncture Related Techniques, Arkansas State Board
Arkansas State Medical Board
Athletic Training, Arkansas State Board
Breast Cancer Control Advisory Board
Chiropractic Examiners, Arkansas State Board
Dental Examiners, Arkansas State Board
Dietetics Licensing, Arkansas Board
Dispensing Opticians, Arkansas State Board
Examiners of Alcoholism and Drug Abuse Counselors. Arkansas State Board
Examiners in Counseling, Arkansas State Board
Examiners in Speech-Language Pathology and Audiology, Arkansas Board
Health, Arkansas State Board of 
Health Education, Arkansas Board of
Hearing Instrument Dispensers, Arkansas State Board
Interpreters for the Deaf, Advisory Board
Nursing, Arkansas Board
OPP Advisory Board
Optometry, Arkansas State Board
Pharmacy, Arkansas State Board
Physical Therapy, Arkansas State Board
Podiatric Medicine Board
Psychology, Arkansas Board
Registered Sanitarians, Arkansas State Board
Social Work Licensing Board

Commissions
Arkansas Health Services Permit Agency
Arkansas Kidney Disease Commission
Arkansas Minority Health Commission
Arkansas Spinal Cord Commission
Arkansas Tobacco Settlement Commission
Athletic Commission, Arkansas State
OHIT - SHARE

Councils
Arkansas Diabetes Advisory Council
Chronic Disease Coordinating Council
STEMI Advisory Council (STAC)

Committees
Arkansas Acute Stroke Care Task Force (ASCTF)
Arkansas Cancer Coalition
Arkansas Clinical Transformation (ACT) Collaborative 
Arkansas Coalition for Obesity Prevention (ARCOP)
Arkansas Maternal Mortality Review Committee
Arkansas Oral Health Coalition
Arkansas Wellness Coalition
Cervical Cancer Task Force
Child Health Advisory Committee
Cosmetology Technical Advisory Committee
Drinking-Water Advisory and Water Operator Licensing Committee
Full Independent Practice Credentialing Committee
Healthcare - Associated Infections Advisory Committee
Massage Therapy Technical Advisory Committee
Medical Ionizing Radiation Licensure Committee (MIRLC)
Plumbing Examiner's Committee

See also

 Arkansas Department of Environmental Quality

References

See also
 

Medical and health organizations based in Arkansas
Health, Department of
Arkansas
1971 establishments in Arkansas